Empress Zhaode may refer to:

Empress Wang (Dezong) (died 6 December 786), wife of Emperor Dezong of Tang
Empress Mingde (Jin dynasty) (died 1152), wife of Emperor Shizong of Jin